Tapeina is a genus of Neotropical longhorn beetles (family Cerambycidae) in the subfamily Lamiinae. It is the only genus in the tribe Tapeinini.

Species
 Tapeina bicolor Lepeletier & Audinet-Serville in Latreille, 1828
 Tapeina coronata Lep. & Aud.-Serv.in Latreille, 1828
 Tapeina dispar Lep. & Aud.-Serv., 1828
 Tapeina erectifrons Thomson, 1857
 Tapeina hylaeana Marinoni, 1972
 Tapeina melzeri Zajciw, 1966
 Tapeina paulista Marinoni, 1972
 Tapeina rubronigra Marinoni, 1972
 Tapeina rudifrons Marinoni, 1972
 Tapeina transversifrons Thomson, 1857

References

Lamiinae